Marvin L. White (born December 5, 1983 in Port Barre, Louisiana) is a former American football safety. He was drafted by the Cincinnati Bengals in the fourth round of the 2007 NFL Draft. He played college football at Kilgore College from 2003-04, then played at Texas Christian.

White has also played for the Dallas Cowboys and Detroit Lions of the NFL, and the Calgary Stampeders of the CFL.

Early years
White was a stand out athlete at Port Barre High, where he earned 14 total letters (4 each in football, basketball and track and 2 in baseball).  As a senior in 2002, he led the Red Devils to their first-ever Louisiana Class 2A Football State Championship, and was named All-State in both football and basketball.

College career

Kilgore College
White attended Kilgore College in Kilgore, Texas, where he was named a junior college All-American while leading the Rangers to a 10-2 record in 2004.

TCU
After his two years at Kilgore, White transferred to TCU in Fort Worth.  As a junior in 2005, he started nine games, including the last seven of the season and was a big part of TCU's conference championship in their first year in the Mountain West Conference.  After the season, White was named second-team All-MWC.

During his senior season at TCU, White led the team in both interceptions and tackles.  His performance earned him first-team All-MWC honors as well as an invitation to play in the annual East-West Shrine Game.

His intense style of play and tenacious hitting, coupled with his being a native of Louisiana has earned him the nickname of "Gator" from his teammates and fans.  His most memorable moment at TCU will almost undoubtedly be what has come to be known as "The Great White Hit".  In the fourth quarter of a home game against rival Texas Tech, White hit Red Raiders' receiver Robert Johnson so hard that his helmet came off, and Johnson was removed from the game due to injury.

The hit caused announcer Glenn Parker to describe White with the following: "he has a suddenness about him and violence in him."

He was an education major.

Professional career

First stint with Bengals
White was selected by the Cincinnati Bengals in the fourth round (114th overall) in the 2007 NFL Draft. He started three games at free safety and made a total of 19 tackles that season. On September 5, 2009, White was released from the Bengals. The Bengals re-signed their former fourth round draft pick on August 22, 2010 after an injury to Safety Gibril Wilson in a preseason game against the Eagles.

Dallas Cowboys
White was claimed off waivers by the Dallas Cowboys on September 6, 2009. He appeared in three games and recorded two tackles before being waived to make room for running back Chauncey Washington. On October 5, the Cowboys waived Washington with the intention of re-signing White, but he was claimed off waivers by the Detroit Lions.

Detroit Lions
White was claimed off waivers by the Detroit Lions on October 5, 2009.

Second stint with Bengals
White was re-signed by the Bengals on August 22, 2010 after the injury of safety Gibril Wilson. He was released on August 24, 2011.

Calgary Stampeders
On March 13, 2012 White signed with the Calgary Stampeders of the Canadian Football League. He was released by Calgary in January 2013.

References

External links
Cincinnati Bengals bio
Detroit Lions bio
TCU Horned Frogs bio

1983 births
Living people
People from St. Landry Parish, Louisiana
Players of American football from Louisiana
American football safeties
TCU Horned Frogs football players
Cincinnati Bengals players
Dallas Cowboys players
Detroit Lions players
Calgary Stampeders players